Moustapha Kama (born 28 January 1992) is a Senegalese taekwondo practitioner. He is a two-time medalist at the African Games and a bronze medalist at the Islamic Solidarity Games. He has also won medals at the African Taekwondo Championships.

In 2018, at the 2018 African Taekwondo Championships held in Agadir, Morocco, he won the silver medal in the men's 54 kg event.

In 2019, he represented Senegal at the 2019 African Games held in Rabat, Morocco and he won one of the bronze medals in the men's 54 kg event. In 2020, he competed in the men's 58 kg event at the 2020 African Taekwondo Olympic Qualification Tournament in Rabat, Morocco without qualifying for the 2020 Summer Olympics in Tokyo, Japan.

References

External links 
 

Living people
1992 births
Place of birth missing (living people)
Senegalese male taekwondo practitioners
African Games medalists in taekwondo
African Games silver medalists for Senegal
African Games bronze medalists for Senegal
Competitors at the 2015 African Games
Competitors at the 2019 African Games
African Taekwondo Championships medalists
Islamic Solidarity Games medalists in taekwondo
Islamic Solidarity Games competitors for Senegal
21st-century Senegalese people